Polypoetes tinalandia is a moth of the family Notodontidae. It is found along the Pacific slope of the Ecuadorian Andes.

The length of the forewings is 14-14.5 mm for males and 14.5–15 mm for females. The ground color of the forewings is dark gray-brown to blackish brown, but lighter gray in the basal third. The central area of the hindwings is translucent white.

Etymology
The name of this species refers to the type locality, Tinalandia, Ecuador.

References

Moths described in 2008
Notodontidae of South America